ACPT may refer to:
 American Crossword Puzzle Tournament
 , an enzyme